The Gardline Group is a holding company based in Great Yarmouth, England. The group consists of more than 35 companies focussed primarily on service industries. The holding company was established in 2009 to bring together a number of existing companies including the original Gardline Shipping, first established in 1969 which continues today, focussed on shipping and other maritime services.

History

Gardline Shipping was first established in 1969 to provide marine support to offshore oil and gas industry in the North Sea. In 2009, as part of 40th anniversary celebrations, the Gardline Group was established to bring together a large number of multi-disciplinary companies involved in a range of activities that include satellite communications, marine sciences, security, ship building, dry dock engineering, geographical information systems, digital mapping and vessel charters.

The group currently employs around 1,000 personnel worldwide and has a turnover of approximately £140 million (GBP). Gardline is now the largest employer in the Great Yarmouth area. The company continues to sponsor careers fairs in the region.

In 2011, the Gardline Group was ranked the 20th largest in the Norfolk region by the Eastern Daily Press, accounting firm PricewaterhouseCoopers (UK) and law firm Mills & Reeve.

Offshore wind farms

In recent years, Gardline and its subsidiary companies have expanded their services to include support of offshore wind farms as a core service. The company's offshore wind farm related businesses have experienced significant growth in line with the UK Government's wind farm development programs.

In 2010, Gardline Environmental, a subsidiary of Gardline Marine Services, won a tender to provide environmental survey services for the proposed Dogger Bank offshore wind farm. Later that year, the company announced it had been awarded environmental survey work for the proposed Atlantic Array offshore wind farm project.

In 2012, Gardline announced it had entered a bid to provide port operations services to ScottishPower Renewables and Vattenfall AB, one of the successful consortia in Round 3 of the UK Government's offshore wind farm program. In 2013, another Gardline subsidiary, Alicat Workboats, announced the construction of 4 high-speed catamarans to service the Robin Rigg Wind Farm.

Group companies

The Gardline Group is a multinational corporation with companies and offices around the world.

America
In the United States, the company is represented by Gardline Surveys Inc and G Comm, Houston.

Europe
In Europe, the company has a number of major subsidiaries including AST, C A Design Services Ltd (including 3d Architects, Gardline Infotech now re-branded CADS Mapping, Tait Design and Cadnet Ltd), North Sea Marine Cluster, G Comm, Richards Dry Dock and Engineering (including Alicat Workboats Limited), Gardline Marine Science Limited, Gardline Shipping Ltd, Lankelma Limited, MK Services Limited, SEtech Limited, The Howards Group (including Howards Residential and Howards Commercial), Titan Environmental Surveys Ltd and Independent Electrical Service Ltd.

Middle East
In the Middle East, the company is represented by Gardline Lankelma (Middle East) Limited.

Australasia
In Asia, the company is represented by Ast Asia Pte Ltd and Gardline Surveys (Far East) Ltd.

In Australia, Gardline is represented by Ast Australia, Gardline Australia Pty Ltd and Gardline Marine Sciences Pty Ltd.

In Malaysia, Gardline is represented by Asian Geos Sdn Bhd.

Africa
In Africa, Gardline is represented by AST South Africa.

Gardline Shipping

As the original foundation entity of the Gardline Group, Gardline Shipping retains the core businesses of the Gardline Group.

The company operates a fleet of 12 offshore vessels, 4 nearshore and coastal vessels and numerous windfarm support vessels. The fleet is capable of carrying out hydrographic, geotechnical, oceanographic, geophysical, and environmental surveys.

Current Fleet

Offshore Survey Vessels

Tranship B.V. Offshore Vessels (Managed by Gardline) 

Customs Vessels

Gardline Marine Sciences and Gardine Australia own two vessels which are currently being leased to Australian Customs and Border Protection Service.

Nearshore and Coastal Vessels

Windfarm Support Vessels

Past Gardline Vessels

Gallery

References

External links 
www.gardlinemarinesciences.com
www.thecadsgroup.co.uk
www.cadesignservices.co.uk
www.cadnet.ltd.uk

Conglomerate companies of the United Kingdom
Shipping companies of the United Kingdom
Great Yarmouth
Design companies of the United Kingdom
Companies based in Norfolk